Arián Iznaga Aldiles (Villa Clara Province) is a Paralympic athlete from Cuba competing mainly in category T11 sprint events.

Arian competed at the 2004 Summer Paralympics in the 100m and 200m but it was he teamed up with his Cuban teammates as part of the 4 × 100 m he won a silver medal. He competed in the 2008 Summer Paralympics in Beijing, China.  There he won a bronze medal in the men's 200 metres - T11 event

References

External links

Paralympic athletes of Cuba
Athletes (track and field) at the 2008 Summer Paralympics
Paralympic bronze medalists for Cuba
Cuban male sprinters
Year of birth missing (living people)
Living people
Medalists at the 2004 Summer Paralympics
Medalists at the 2008 Summer Paralympics
Paralympic silver medalists for Cuba
Paralympic medalists in athletics (track and field)
Medalists at the 2011 Parapan American Games
People from Villa Clara Province